Richard Bergmann (10 April 1919 – 5 April 1970) was an Austrian and British international table tennis player. Winner of seven World Championships, including four Singles, one Men's Doubles, two Team's titles and 22 medals in total. He is considered to be one of the greatest players in history, only Viktor Barna has won more World Championship gold medals in singles.

Table tennis career
His 22 World Championship medals include seven gold medals; two in the men's team, one in the men's doubles at the 1936 World Table Tennis Championships with Viktor Barna and four times in the singles at the 1937, 1939, 1948 and 1950.

Legacy
Bergmann was inducted into the International Jewish Sports Hall of Fame in 1982, and into the International Table Tennis Foundation Hall of Fame in 1993 as one of twelve founding members. Since 1967, the Richard Bergmann Fair Play Trophy is contested at the Liebherr World Championships.

See also
List of select Jewish table tennis players
 List of table tennis players
 List of World Table Tennis Championships medalists
 List of England players at the World Team Table Tennis Championships

References 

1919 births
1970 deaths
Sportspeople from Vienna
Austrian male table tennis players
Jewish table tennis players
Austrian Jews
Austrian people of Polish-Jewish descent
Austrian people of Italian descent
English Jews
English people of Austrian-Jewish descent
Jews who immigrated to the United Kingdom to escape Nazism
English male table tennis players